Just Jim may refer to:

 Just Jim (1915 film), a 1915 American film
 Just Jim (2015 film), a 2015 British film